Ségur is a station on Line 10 of the Paris Métro. It is located on the border of the 7th arrondissement and 15th arrondissement. It is named after avenue de Ségur located 100 m northeast of the station. It was in turn named after Marquis Philippe Henri de Ségur, a Marshall of France and Secretary of State for War from 1780 to 1787. The name Ségur is better known by the novels of his granddaughter by marriage, the Countess of Ségur (1799-1874), best known for her novel, Les Malheurs de Sophie.

History
The station opened on 29 September 1937 when line 10 was extended from Duroc to La Motte-Picquet (now known as La Motte-Picquet–Grenelle), two months after the opening of the section between La Motte-Picquet and Duroc and trains skipped the station.The nameplates on the platforms are subtitiled UNESCO, due to the location of the station near its headquarters. It, however, does not appear on maps published by the RATP.

As part of the "Renouveau du métro" programme by the RATP, the station's platforms and lights were renovated and modernised on 4 January 2006.

In 2019, the station was used by 1,662,452  passengers, making it the 269th busiest of the Métro network out of 302 stations.

In 2020, the station was used by 804,110 passengers amidst the COVID-19 pandemic, making it the 267th busiest of the Métro network out of 108 stations.

In 2021, the station was used by 1,100,151 passengers, making it the 277th busiest of the Métro network out of 305 stations.

Passenger services

Access 
The station has 2 accesses:

 Access 1: avenue de Suffren UNESCO - Fontenoy
 Access 2: boulevard Garibaldi UNESCO - Miollis

Station layout

Platforms 
The station has a standard configuration with 2 tracks surrounded by 2 side platforms.

Other connections 
This station is not served by any buses from the RATP bus network.

Nearby 

 avenue de Breteuil, a famous avenue leading to the Invalides.
 École Militaire
 UNESCO Headquarters

Gallery

References

Roland, Gérard (2003). Stations de métro. D’Abbesses à Wagram. Éditions Bonneton.

Paris Métro stations in the 15th arrondissement of Paris
Paris Métro stations in the 7th arrondissement of Paris
Railway stations in France opened in 1937
Paris Métro line 10